Ramona Lutheran Christian School is a private Lutheran elementary school in Ramona, California, in the United States. Established in 1977, the school serves students in preschool through sixth grade and is the only private Christian school in Ramona.

Ramona Lutheran Christian School is affiliated with the Pacific Southwest District of the Lutheran Church–Missouri Synod.

History
The congregation of Ramona Lutheran Church saw a need for Christian education in the community, so the school was created in 1977.

Campus
The Ramona Lutheran Christian School campus is situated on a fenced and landscaped  campus on the property of Ramona Lutheran Church. The outdoor lunch area consists of quality picnic tables, a large shade cover and deciduous trees. Hot lunches can be purchased daily.  Two new playgrounds were designed/planned by a local landscape architect and the school playground committee. They meet all California safety standards and ADA requirements. The playground is surrounded by a new running track and a large grass area, a new basketball and wall ball courts and bleachers for the softball field.

The school added a new two-classroom building in 2002 to accommodate growth.

Curriculum
Traditional learning in Language Arts, Mathematics, Science, and Social Studies promoting critical-thinking skills. Enrichment courses include lab science, PE, computer lab (including work on tablets), cooking, writing lab, band and vocal music classes. Outdoor activities include PE, running club and an outdoor garden learning lab with organic seasonal vegetables, fruit trees and gardening curriculum.

Extra-curricular activities
Ramona Lutheran Christian School participates in the San Diego Regional Lutheran Schools Annual Spelling Bee and in the Annual Regional “Eagle” math completion.

References

External links
 Ramona Lutheran Christian School

Education in San Diego County, California
Lutheran schools in California
Private middle schools in California
Private elementary schools in California
Schools affiliated with the Lutheran Church–Missouri Synod
1977 establishments in California
Educational institutions established in 1977